Haliplus fulvus is a species of crawling water beetle in the family Haliplidae.

References

Further reading

External links

 

Haliplidae
Beetles described in 1801